Brainbox is a Dutch rock group from the late 1960s/early 1970s.  The band was founded in Amsterdam by guitarist Jan Akkerman
, drummer Pierre van der Linden and singer Kazimir Lux (Kaz). Their debut single was "Down Man", which established their progressive blues sound. They had several hit singles in the Netherlands, including "Down Man". "Doomsday Train", "Summertime", "To You", "Virgin" and "The Smile".

In late 1969, soon after they released their first album, Akkerman left to join Focus, later recruiting van der Linden as well, then Brainbox bass player Cyril Havermans. They were replaced by guitarists Herman Meyer and Rudie de Queljoe and drummer Frans Smit. Meyer was later replaced by John Schuursma. After Kaz Lux left Brainbox in 1971, popularity waned and they split up in 1972. Lux reassembled the band in 2004 (though without Akkerman) and they performed in the Netherlands. In 2010 and 2011, the band performed again and recorded a new studio album, The 3rd Flood.

Discography

Studio albums
 Brainbox (1969)
 Parts (1972)
 The 3rd Flood (2011)

Compilation albums
 The Best of Brainbox (1971)
 To You (1972)
 A History (1979)
 Brainbox (1979)
 The Very Best Brainbox Album Ever (2002)

Live albums
 The Last Train live (2004)

Singles

Tip – Tipparade bubbling Under chart

Notes

External links
Brainbox archived website
Brainbox biography at Metal Music Archives
Brainbox biography at Prog Archives
Tag Archives: Brainbox

Dutch rock music groups
Dutch progressive rock groups